Damir Džumhur was the defending champion but lost in the second round.

Kimmer Coppejans won the title, defeating Marsel İlhan in the final, 6–2, 6–2.

Seeds

Draw

Finals

Top half

Bottom half

References
 Main Draw
 Qualifying Draw

Mersin Cup - Singles